Final Shot: The Hank Gathers Story is an American 1992 sports  drama biography television film about the life of Loyola Marymount basketball player Eric "Hank" Gathers, written for Tribune Entertainment by Fred Johnson, Don Enright and Ed Fields, and directed by Charles Braverman.

Synopsis
This film follows the life of basketball legend Eric "Hank" Gathers, from his growing up in the ghettos of Philadelphia to his freshman year at USC through his brief career playing basketball for Loyola Marymount University, where he collapsed during a game and died of a heart ailment.

Partial cast
 Victor Love as Hank Gathers
 Duane Davis as Bo Kimble
 George Kennedy as Father Dave
 Nell Carter as Lucille Gathers
 Sam Hennings as Coach Spencer
 Reynaldo Rey as Red
 Whitman Mayo as Nick
 Ed Arnold as Himself
 Bart Braverman as Tom Talmadge
 Dick Baker as Referee
 John Mahon as Paul Westhead
 Ken Foree as First USC Coach
 Milt Kogan as Doctor
 Baldwin C. Sykes as Specs
 Michael D. Hall as Heat Gates
 Cory Curtis as Young Heat Gates
 De'Andre Alfred as Noo-Noo Gathers
 Donny B. Lord as Young Hank Gathers
 Michole White as Taffy
 David Netter as Aaron

Production
Casting began in late 1991, with a television debut slated for March 1992.  The project was filmed in North Philadelphia, Pennsylvania; as well as in Santa Monica and Los Angeles, California.

Reception
Entertainment Weekly wrote that the film "does a decent job of showing us the person inside the uniform," but felt that the film is overall "too sketchily told to be truly satisfying."

Dallas Morning News felt that the film went beyond disappointing to become "an insult -- not for what it focuses on, but for what it leaves out." The reviewer felt that the film fell "in line with many TV projects based on real-life people by reducing its subject to sterotypes."

Philadelphia Inquirer wrote that film suffered in its dwelling less on the formative events of Gathers' life to concentrate too much upon his basketball career.

Conversely, San Diego Union-Tribune felt the film was a fitting tribute to Hank Gathers' memory.

Variety wrote that while some of the scenes were awkward, the film "sets a fine example of what a youth under pressure in North Philly can accomplish."  They wrote that it is the growing relation of Hank Gathers with his college teammate Bo Kimble as friends and players that holds the viewer's interest, while making note that Gathers' off-court life remains "shadowy and vague".

References

External links
 
 

1992 films
1992 television films
1990s biographical drama films
1990s sports films
American basketball films
Biographical films about sportspeople
Cultural depictions of basketball players
Films scored by Stanley Clarke
Films directed by Charles Braverman
Films set in Philadelphia
Films shot in Los Angeles
Films shot in Philadelphia
History of college basketball in the United States
Loyola Marymount Lions men's basketball
Sports films based on actual events
Films set in 1978
Films set in 1989
Films set in 1990
Films produced by Tribune Entertainment
1992 drama films
1990s English-language films
1990s American films